Chudeau's spiny mouse (Acomys chudeaui) is a species of rodent in the family Muridae found in Mauritania and Morocco. Its natural habitats are rocky areas and hot deserts.

References

Acomys
Rodents of North Africa
Mammals described in 1911
Taxonomy articles created by Polbot
Taxobox binomials not recognized by IUCN